This is a list of some of the major characters that have appeared in the soap opera Another World, which originally aired from May 4, 1964, to June 25, 1999.

A
Joyce Abernathy
Played by Rena Sofer, 1987

Dave Adama
Played by John Mattey, 1996-1999
Police officer.

Wayne Addison
Played by Edmund Hashim, 1969; Robert Milli, 1969-1970

Tom Albini
Played by Pierrino Mascorino, 1970-1971; Peter Brandon, 1979

Mark Allen
Played by Bill Shanks, 1991; Nick Gregory. 1991

Ms. Margaret Allen
Played by Christopher Norris, 1998

Kevin Anderson
Played by Jamie Goodwin, 1991-1993

Dean Andrews
Played by James Sutorius, 1982

Frank Andrews
Played by Peter Brandon, 1964-1965

Willie Armstrong
Played by Giancarlo Esposito, 1982

B
Blair Baker
Played by Kathy Carrier, 1995-1996; Bridget White, 1996

Rusty Bakersfield
Played by Jon Curry, 1997

Tito Banacek
Played by Tony Templeton, 1998; Troy Hall, 1998-1999

Brian Bancroft
Played by Paul Stevens, 1977-1985

Ted Bancroft
Played by Eric Roberts, 1977; Richard Backus, 1979; Luke Reilly, 1983-1984

Brenda Barlowe
Played by Betty White, 1988

Greg Barnard
Played by Ned Schmidtke, 1977-1978

Ken Baxter
Played by William Prince, 1964-1965

Laura Baxter
Played by Augusta Dabney, 1964-1965

Tom Baxter
Played by Nicholas Pryor, 1964

Reena Bellman Cook
Played by Carla Borelli, 1979-1980

Striker Bellman
Played by Clifton James, 1980

Lord Peter Belton
Played by Michael Tylo, 1980

Taylor Benson
Played by Christine Andreas, 1990-1991
Doctor.

Ed Berns
Played by Eugene Smith, 1986

Roy Bingham
Played by Morgan Freeman, 1982-1984
Doctor.

Ellen Bishop Grant
Played by Georgann Johnson, 1970

Mitch Blake
Played by William Gray Espy, 1979-1982, 1986-1990

Russell Boyd
Played by Jay Bontatibus, 1996

Hunter Bradshaw
Played by Robert Sedgwick, 1984-1985

Pamela Blair 
Played by Bonnie Broderick (1994)

Cindy Brooke
Played by Kim Rhodes, 1996-1999

Leonard Brooks
Played by Joseph Maher, 1975-1978; John Horton, 1978; John Tillinger, 1978-1980, 1981-1982

Antoinette "Toni" Burrell
Played by Rhonda Ross Kendrick, 1997-1999
A police officer. Engaged to Chris Madison. Daughter of Etta Mae Burrell and her late husband, Harold. Has three other siblings: Judy, Edmund and K.C.

Etta Mae Burrell
Played by Elain R. Graham, 1996-1999
Owner of the Lucky Lady. Was married to Harold Burrell. Mother of five children: Judy, Edmund, Toni and K.C. Burrell.

Judy Burrell
Played by Darlene Love, 1993; Saundra McClain, 1993-1995; Kim Sykes, 1995-1996

Kineisha "K.C." Burrell
Played by Persia White, 1999
Reporter. Attending Harvard University in the fall of 1999. Youngest child of Etta Mae Burrell and her late husband, Harold Burrell. She has three older siblings: Judy, Edmund and Toni.

C
Karen Campbell
Played by Laurie Bartram, 1978–79

Joe Carlino
Played by Joseph Barbara, 1995–99

Paulina Cory Carlino
Played by Cali Timmins, 1990–91; Judi Evans, 1991–99

Sofia Carlino
Played by Dahlia Salem, 1995–98

Tony Carlisle
Played by John H Brennan, 1986–87; Jason Culp, 1997

Czaja Carnek
Played by Ving Rhames, 1986

Elliott Carrington
Played by James Douglas, 1972–74

Iris Carrington
Played by Beverlee McKinsey, 1972–80; Carmen Duncan, 1988–94

Christy Carson
Played by Patti D'Arbanville, 1992–93

Dustin Carter
Played by Vince Williams, 1996–97

Rafe Carter
Played by Philip Sterling, 1970–71

Lucas Castigliano
Played by John Aprea, 1989–92

Chris Chapin
Played by Don Scardino, 1985–86

Ted Clark
Played by Stephen Bolster, 1971–73

Emily Cole
Played by Joanna Merlin, 1981–82
Doctor.

Bridget Connell
Played by Barbara Berjer, 1985–98

Kevin Cooke
Played by Lee Patterson, 1979–80

Billy Cooper
Played by Ruben Santiago-Hudson, 1990–93

Adam Cory
Played by Ed Fry, 1986–89

Blaine Ewing Cory
Played by Laura Malone, 1978–84; Judy Dewey, 1984–85

Jasmine Cory
Played by Alexandra, Jacqueline, and Sydney Lademan, 1999

Mac Cory
Played by Robert Emhardt, 1973–74; Douglass Watson, 1974–89

Maggie Cory
Played by Robyn Griggs, 1993–95; Jodi Lyn O'Keefe, 1995; Lisa Brenner, 1995–96, Julie Nathanson 1996

Matthew Cory
Played by Matthew Maienczyk, 1980-1982; Daniel Dale, 1986–87; Matt Crane, 1988–97, 1998–99; Brian Krause, 1997–98; Jeff Phillips, 1998

Neal Cory
Played by Robert Lupone, 1985–86

Rachel Cory Hutchins
Played by Robin Strasser, 1967–72; Maggie Impert 1971–72; Victoria Wyndham, 1972–99

Sandy Cory
Played by Christopher Rich, 1981–85; Stephen Bogardus, 1993

Wally Curtin, Jr.
Played by Scott Firestone, 1971–72; Jason Gladstone, 1972–74; Dennis McKiernan, 1974–75

Walter Curtin, Sr.
Played by Val Dufour, 1967–72

D
Derek Dane
Played by Kevin Carrigan, 1989-1990

Henry Davenport
Played by Theodore Bikel, 1982-1997

Pamela "Pammy" Davis
Played by Pamela Toll, 1970

Lenore Curtin Delaney
Played by Judith Barcroft, 1966-1971; Susan Sullivan, 1971-1976

Robert Delaney
Played by Nicolas Coster, 1970, 1972-1976, 1980, 1989

Cecile DePoulignac
Played by Susan Keith, 1979-1981; Nancy Frangione, 1981-1984, 1986, 1989, 1993, 1995-1996

Elena DePoulignac
Played by Christina Pickles, 1977-1979; Maeve McGuire, 1982-1983
Countess.

Lorna Devon
Played by Alicia Coppola, 1991-1994; Robin Christopher, 1994-1997

Ernie Downs
Played by Harry Bellaver, 1968-1971

Mitchell Dru
Played by Geoffrey Lumb, 1964-1971

Jason Dunlap
Played by Warren Burton, 1980-1982

Martha Dunlay
Played by Carol Lynley, 1989
Judge.

Royal Dunning
Played by Mike Minor, 1983-1984
Doctor.

Meredith Dunston
Played by Joan Rivers, 1997

Justine Duvalier
Played by Victoria Wyndham, 1995

E
Bunny Eberhart
Played by Marcia McCabe, 1995

Al Edwards
Played by Arthur French, 1986-1990

Julie Ann Edwards
Played by Tara Wilson, 1986-1990

Zack Edwards
Played by James Pickens, Jr., 1986-1990

Sam Egan
Played by Drew Snyder, 1982

Curtis Eldon
Played by William Bogert, 1981-1982

Carla Elliott
Played by Cynthia Leigh Young, 1994-1999
Police officer.

Courtney Evans
Played by Bellamy Young, 1995; Stina Nielsen, 1995-1996
Doctor.

Dee Evans
Played by Katie Rich, 1985-1986

Catlin Ewing
Played by Thomas Ian Griffith, 1984-1987

Clarice Ewing
Played by Gail Brown, 1975-1986

Cory Ewing
Played by Carmine Rizzo, 1977-1985

Jeanne Ewing
Played by Betty Miller, 1983

Larry Ewing
Played by Richard J. Porter, 1978-1986

Sally Ewing
Played by Cathy Greene, 1975-1978; Julie Philips, 1979-1980; Jennifer Runyon, 1981-1983; Dawn Benz, 1983; Mary Page Keller, 1983-1985; Taylor Miller, 1985-1986

F
Danny Fargo
Played by Antony Ponzini, 1966–1967

Gil Fenton
Played by Tom Wiggin, 1983–1984

Marie Fenton
Played by Lenka Peterson, 1983

Vera Finley
Played by Carol Mayo Jenkins, 1977

Frank Fisk
Played by William H. Macy, 1982

Alexandra "Alli" Fowler
Played by Lindsay Lohan, 1996–1997; Alicia Leigh Willis, 1998–1999

Loretta Fowler
Played by Rosemary Murphy, 1988

Sam Fowler
Played by Robert Kelker-Kelly, 1987–1990; Thomas Gibson, 1990; Danny Markel, 1990–1991; Brian Lane Green, 1991–1993

Alice Frame
Played by Jacqueline Courtney, 1964–1975, 1984–1985, 1989; Susan Harney, 1975–1979; Wesley Ann Pfenning, 1979; Vana Tribbey, 1981; Linda Borgeson 1981–1982

Dean Frame
Played by Ricky Paull Goldin, 1990-1993, 1994-1995, 1998

Evan Frame
Played by Charles Grant, 1988-1990; Eric Scott Woods, 1994-1995

Frankie Frame
Played by Alice Barrett, 1989-1996, 1999

Gwen Frame
Played by Dorothy Lyman, 1976-1980, 1989

Jamie Frame
Played by Seth Holzlein, 1970; Aiden McNulty, 1972-1973; Tyler Mead, 1973; Brad Bedford, 1973; Robert Doran, 1973-1978; Tim Holcomb, 1978-1979; Richard Bekins, 1979-1983; Stephen Yates, 1983-1985; Laurence Lau, 1986-1990; Russell Todd, 1990-1993
Doctor.

Janice Frame
Played by Victoria Thompson, 1972-1974; Christine Jones, 1978-1980, 1989

Jason Frame
Played by Chris Robinson, 1987-1989

Steve Frame
Played by George Reinholt, 1968-1975, 1989; David Canary, 1981-1983

Steven Frame
Played by John Nash, 1989-1994; Christopher Conroy, 1994-1995; Spencer Treat Clark, 1995-1997, 1998-1999; Michael Angarano, 1998; Jimmy McQuaid, 1998

Vince Frame
Played by Jay Morran, 1978-1979

Willis Frame
Played by John Fitzpatrick, 1975-1976; Leon Russom, 1976-1980

Ilsa Fredericks
Played by Gwyda Donhowe, 1981-1982

G
Felicia Gallant
Played by Linda Dano, 1983-1999

Brett Gardener
Played by Colleen Dion, 1992-1994

Edward Gerald
Played by John Saxon, 1985-1986

Amy Gifford
Played by Christine Jones, 1977

David Gilchrist
Played by David Ackroyd, 1974-1977
Doctor.

Alan Glaser
Played by David O'Brien, 1986-1987
Doctor.

Louise Goddard
Played by Anne Meacham, 1972-1980, 1981-1982

Beatrice Gordon
Played by Jacqueline Brookes, 1975-1976

Ray Gordon
Played by Ted Shackelford, 1975-1976; Gary Carpenter, 1977

Lisa Grady
Played by Joanna Going, 1987-1989

Edward Grant
Played by John Saxon, 1985-1986

Bert Gregory
Played by House Jameson, 1964
Doctor.

Jerry Grove
Played by Michael Garfield, 1979-1989; Kevin Conway, 1980; Paul Tinder, 1981

Scott Guthrie
Played by Bronson Picket, 1998

H
David Halliday
Played by David Andrew MacDonald, 1999

Marianne Halloway
Played by Jeanne Beirne, 1970; Lora McDonald, 1971; Tracey Brown, 1971; Christopher Corwin, 1971; Loriann Ruger, 1972-1973; Tiberia Mitri, 1974-1975; Ariana Chase, 1975-1976; Ariane Muenker 1976-1977; Adrienne Wallace, 1977-1979; Beth Collins, 1980-1982

Rick Halloway
Played by Tony Cummings, 1980-1982

Taylor Halloway
Played by Ron Harper, 1980

Ed Harding
Played by Howard Rollins, 1982

Quinn Harding
Played by Petronia Paley, 1981-1987

Herb Harris
Played by David Schramm, 1984

Grant Harrison
Played by Dack Rambo, 1990-1991; Mark Pinter, 1991-1999

Kelsey Harrison
Played by Kaitlin Hopkins, 1992-1994

Kirkland Harrison
Played by Austin and Evan Tennenbaum, 1994-1995; Kyle and Ryan Pepi, 1995; Connor Rademaker, 1995-1996; Sean Rademaker, 1996-1999

Ruth Harrison
Played by Cynthia Harris, 1992; Tanny McDonald, 1993

Ryan Harrison
Played by Paul Michael Valley, 1990-1995, 1996-1997

Spencer Harrison
Played by David Hedison, 1991-1995

Vic Hastings
Played by John Considine, 1974-1976

Eric Hilker
Played by Michael Ingram, 1964-1965
Doctor

Ada Hobson
Played by Constance Ford, 1967-1992

Charlie Hobson
Played by Fred J. Scollay, 1977-1980

Denny Hobson
Played by James Horan, 1981-1982

Leigh Hobson
Played by Christopher Knight, 1980-1981

Greg Houston
Played by Christopher Cousins, 1986-1987

Clara Hudson
Played by Scotty Bloch, 1987 (two episodes); Kate Wilkinson, 1987–1989; Peg Small, 1995

Donna Hudson
Played by Anna Stuart, 1983-1986, 1989-1999; Philece Sampler, 1987-1989; Sofia Landon Geier, 1991, 1993

Gregory Hudson
Played by Jude Sullivan, 1991; Alex Bowen, 1996; Morgan Hodgen, 1996 Chris Marquette, 1996-1997

John Hudson
Played by David Forsyth, 1987-1997

Marley Hudson
Played by Ellen Wheeler, 1984-1986, 1998-1999; Anne Heche, 1987-1989, 1990-1991; Jensen Buchanan, 1991-1994, 1997-1998

Michael Hudson
Played by Kale Browne, 1986-1992, 1995-1998

Nick Hudson
Played by Justin Chambers, 1995; Kevin McClatchy, 1995-1996; Mark Mortimer, 1996-1999

Sharlene Hudson
Played by Laurie Heineman, 1975-1977; Anna Kathryn Holbrook, 1988-1991, 1993-1997, 1999

Carl Hutchins
Played by Charles Keating, 1983-1986, 1991, 1992, 1993-1998, 1999

Perry Hutchins
Played by David Oliver, 1983-1985

J
Neil Johansson
Played by James Hyde, 1997

Caroline Johnson
Played by Rue McClanahan, 1970-1971

Neil Johnson
Played by John Getz, 1974-1975

Sam Johnson
Played by Rawleigh Moreland, 1989
Sheriff.

Shelby Johnson
Played by Tanya Clarke, 1998-1999

David Jordan 
Played by Don Stephenson, 1993-1995

Ken Jordan
Played by Lewis Arlt, 1990-1991

K
Hank Kent
Played by Steve Fletcher, 1992-1994

Susan Kerry
Played by Jewel Turner, 1991

Patricia Kirkland
Played by Janine Turner, 1986-1987

Sylvie Kosloff
Played by Leora Dana, 1978-1979

Dana Kramer
Played by Michelle Hurd, 1991-1997; Cassandra Creech, 1994; Kim Hawthorne, 1997, PaSean Wilson, 1997

Marshall Lincoln Kramer III
Played by Randy Brooks, 1994-1995; André De Shields, 1995-1996

Nina Kreiter
Alice Liu, 1998

L
Theresa Lamonte
Played by Nancy Marchand, 1976

Theo Lane
Played by Norman Parker, 1982

Scott LaSalle
Played by Hank Cheyne, 1986-1988

Jesse Lawrence
Played by Dondre Whitfield, 1989-1990

Reuben Lawrence
Played by Clayton Prince, 1988-1990

Veronica "Ronnie" Lawrence
Played by B.J. Jefferson, 1989-1990, 1991 Rhonda Jensen, 1986-1987

Peggy Lazarus
Played by Rebecca Hollen, 1986-1987

Cindy Lee
Played by Dee Ann Sexton, 1980

Fingers Leroy
Played by Ray Xifo, 1986

Helga Lindeman
Played by Helen Stenborg, 1977-1978

Zane Lindquist
Played by Patrick Tovatt, 1985-1986

Rose Livingston
Played by Ann Flood, 1987

Nicole Love
Played by Kim Morgan Greene, 1983-1984; Laurie Landry, 1986-1987; Anne Marie Howard, 1987-1989

Peter Love
Played by John Hutton, 1982-1984, Christopher Holder, 1985; Marcus Smythe, 1985-1987

Reginald Love
Played by John Considine, 1986-1988

Lahoma Lucas
Played by Ann Wedgeworth, 1967-1970

Sam Lucas
Played by Jordan Charney, 1967-1970, 1973-1974

Philip Lyons
Played by Robert Gentry, 1979-1981

M
Chris Madison
Played by Eric Morgan Stuart, 1988-2016

Rick Madison
Played by Gerald Anthony, 1991-1992

Abel Marsh
Played by Joe Morton, 1983-1984
Doctor.

Drew Marsten
Played by Denny Albee, 1988

Lily Mason
Played by Jackée Harry, 1983-1986

Bill Matthews
Played by Joseph Gallison, 1964-1969

Grandma Matthews
Played by Vera Allen, 1964

Janet Matthews
Played by Liza Chapman, 1964-1966

Jim Matthews
Played by John Beal, 1964; Leon Janney, 1964; Shepperd Strudwick, 1964-1969; Hugh Marlowe, 1969-1982

Liz Matthews
Played by Sarah Cunningham, 1964; Audra Lindley, 1964-1969; Nancy Wickwire, 1969-1971; Irene Dailey, 1974-1986, 1987-1994

Mary Matthews
Played by Virginia Dwyer, 1964-1975

Melissa Matthews
Played by Carol Roux, 1964-1970

Olivia Matthews
Played by Allison Hossack, 1989-1992

Russ Matthews
Played by Joey Trent, 1964, 1965; Sam Groom, 1966-1971; Robert Hover, 1971-1972; David Bailey, 1973-1978; 1979-1981; 1989; 1992
Doctor.

Ed McClain
Frank Runyeon (1994)

Burt McGowan
Played by William Russ, 1977-1978

Gil McGowan
Played by Charles Durning, 1972; Dolph Sweet, 1972-1977
Police Chief.

Nancy McGowan
Played by Jane Cameron, 1984-1987, 1989, 1993

Tim McGowan
Played by Christopher Allport, 1973-1974

Ben McKinnon
Played by Richard Steen, 1984-1985

Cheryl McKinnon
Played by Kristen Marie, 1986-1988

Jake McKinnon
Played by Tom Eplin, 1985-1986, 1988-1999; Ian Boyd, 1998 {flashbacks}

Kathleen McKinnon
Played by Julie Osburn, 1984-1986, 1989, 1991

M.J. McKinnon
Played by Kathleen Layman, 1984-1986; Sally Spencer, 1986-1987

Mary McKinnon
Played by Denise Alexander, 1986-1989

Vicky McKinnon
Played by Ellen Wheeler, 1985-1986; Rhonda Lewin, 1986-1987; Anne Heche, 1987-1991; Jensen Buchanan, 1991-1999

Vince McKinnon
Played by Jack Ryland, 1984-1985; Duke Stroud, 1986; Robert Hogan, 1987-1989, 1991

Gabe McNamara
Played by John Bolger, 1995-1997

Gloria Metcalf
Played by Rosetta LeNoire, 1972

Linda Metcalf
Played by Vera Moore, 1972-1981

Laurie Michaels
Played by Kaili Vernoff, 1995

Sharon Miller
Played by Alberta Grant, 1975

Sara Montaigne
Played by Missy Hughes, 1986-1987

Tyrone Montgomery
Played by Henry Simmons, 1997-1999

Hannah Moore
Played by Jennifer Lien, 1991-1992

Helen Moore
Played by Muriel Williams, 1965-1968, 1970-1976 

Lenore Moore
Played by Judith Barcroft, 1966-1971

Reuben Moreno
Played by José Ferrer, 1983

Adrienne Morrow
Played by Roxann Dawson, 1985

Madge Murray
Played by Doris Belack, 1966-1968

N
Melissa Needham
Played by Taro Meyer, 1981-1982

Tom Nelson
Played by Steven Culp, 1982

Ron Nettles
Played by Ted King, 1993

Fairfax Newman
Played by Nick Gregory, 1996

Alexander Nikos
Played by John Aprea, 1997

Dick Nolan
Played by Lou Sutton, 1968
Lieutenant.

Frederick Nolan
Played by Phillip Clark, 1998
Doctor.

Max Nolan
Played by Andy Davoli, 1996-1999

Peggy Nolan
Played by Micki Grant, 1965-1972

Jenna Norris
Played by Alla Korot, 1990-1993

O
Anne O'Donnell
Played by Alice Barrett, 1999

Dave O'Horgan
Played by Dan Desmond, 1982

Ian O'Leary
Played by Jim Cronin, 1996-1997
Police officer.

Rocky Olsen
Played by John Braden, 1975-1977

Bert Ordway
Played by Roberts Blossom, 1976-1978

Emma Ordway
Played by Beverlee McKinsey, 1972; Tresa Hughes, 1975-76; Elizabeth Ashley, 1990

Jane Overstreet
Played by Frances Sternhagen, 1971

P
Ken Palmer
Played by Will Lyman, 1976-1977

Angie Perrini
Played by Toni Kalem, 1975-1997; Maeve Kinkead, 1977-1980

Joey Perrini
Played by Ray Liotta, 1978-1981

Rose Perrini
Played by Kathleen Widdoes, 1978-1980

Deke Peters
Played by Sean O'Connor, 1982

Brittany Peterson
Played by Sharon Gabet, 1985-1987

Ben Petroni
Played by Kelly Fitzpatrick, 1980-1981

Stuart Philbin
Played by Charles Siebert, 1971
Doctor.

Byron Pierce
Played by Mitch Longley, 1991-1992

Frank Prescott
Played by Mason Adams, 1976-1977
Doctor.

R
Sergei Radzinsky
Played by Jonathan Sharp, 1999

Ian Rain
Played by Julian McMahon, 1993-1995

John Randolph
Played by Michael M. Ryan, 1964-1979

Lee Randolph
Played by Gaye Huston, 1964-1967; Barbara Rodell, 1967-1969

Michael Randolph
Played by Dennis Sullivan, 1970; John Sullivan, 1971; Christopher Corwin, 1971; Tim Nissen, 1972; Tom Ruger, 1972-1973; Tom Sabota Jr., 1974; Glen Zachar, 1974;  Christopher J. Brown, 1974-1975; Lionel Johnston, 1975-1979

Olive Randolph
Played by Jennifer Leak, 1976-1979

Pat Matthews Randolph
Played by Susan Trustman, 1964-1967; Beverly Penberthy, 1967-1982, 1989

Kathryn Reeve
Played by Elaine Princi, 1997
Judge.

Rod Reynolds
Played by Geoffrey Horne, 1983

Tomas Rivera
Played by Diego Serrano, 1994-1997

Lila Roberts
Played by Lisa Peluso, 1997-1999

Shane Roberts
Played by Robert Kelker-Kelly, 1996-1998

Victor Rodriguez
Played by Carlos Sanz, 1993-1994

Chad Rollo
Played by Richard Burgi, 1986-1988

Dawn Rollo
Played by Barbara Tyson, 1987-1988

Alma Rudder
Played by Elizabeth Franz, 1982-1983

S
Ed Sadowski
Played by Steven Ryan, 1981

Pilara Sanchez
Played by Marie Barrientos, 1988-1989

Harry Shea
Played by Edward Power, 1981-1982

Pete Shea
Played by Christopher Marcantel, 1981-1982

Dan Shearer
Played by John Cunningham, 1970-1971; Brian Murray, 1978-1979

Julia Shearer
Played by Kyra Sedgwick, 1982-1983; Jonna Lee, 1983; Faith Ford, 1983-1984

Susan Shearer
Played by Fran Sharon, 1964; Lynn Milgrim, 1978-1979, 1982

Eileen Simpson
Played by Vicky Dawson, 1977-1979

Amanda Sinclair
Played by Nicole Catalanotto, 1978-81; Dana Klaboe, 1981-86; Sandra Ferguson, 1987-1993, 1998-1999; Christine Tucci, 1993-1995; Laura Moss, 1996-1998

Cameron Sincair
Played by Michael Rodrick, 1998-1999

Gary Sinclair
Played by Timothy Gibbs, 1995-1998; John Littlefield, 1998-1999

Josie Sinclair
Played by Alexandra Wilson, 1988-1991; Amy Carlson, 1993-1998; Nadine Stenovitch, 1998-1999

Mark Singleton
Played by Robin Thomas, 1983-1985

Louis St. George
Played by Jack Betts, 1982-1983

Caroline Stafford
Played by Joy Bell, 1988-1991

Jordan Stark
Played by David Andrew Macdonald, 1999

Rich Stevens
Played by himself, 1987-1989

Harriet Sullivan
Played by Jane Alice Brandon, 1972
Registered Nurse.

T
Cliff Tanner
Played by Tom Rolfing, 1977-1978

Joanne Taylor
Played by Melissa Dye, 1997

David Thatcher
Played by Lewis Arlt, 1983-1984

Kevin Thatcher
Played by Trevor Richard, 1983-1986

Michael Thayer
Played by Gary Sandy, 1969

Charles Thompson
Played by Eriq La Salle, 1987

David Thornton
Played by Konrad Matthaei, 1969; Joseph Ponazecki, 1971
Doctor.

Carter Todd
Played by Russell Curry, 1984-1986

Grant Todd
Played by John Dewey Carter, 1984-1985

Glenda Toland
Played by Maia Danziger, 1974-1975

Lily Tran
Played by Alexandra Bokyun Chun, 1992

Beverly Tucker
Played by Christine Baranski, 1983

Hannah Tuttle
Played by Helen Gallagher, 1989

Oliver Twist
Played by Dick Cavett, 1988
Hypnotist.

U

V
Buffy Van Buren
Played by Gloria Hoye, 1982

Lahoma Van Lucas
Played by Ann Wedgeworth, 1967-1970

Alison Van Rohan
Played by Marin Hinkle, 1995

Mike Venable
Played by Andrew Jarkowsky, 1972-1973

W
Dick Wagner
Played by J.J. Johnston, 1982

Courtney Walker
Played by Valarie Pettiford, 1988-1990
Detective.

Wallingford
Played by Brent Collins, 1984-1988

Louis Washburn
Played by Hansford Rowe, 1981

Maisie Watkins
Played by Patricia Hodges, 1982-1987

Barbara Weaver
Played by Roberta Maxwell, 1975; Kathryn Walker, 1976

Evan Webster
Played by Barry Jenner, 1976-1977

Dennis Wheeler
Played by Mike Hammett, 1972-1978; Jim Poyner, 1978-1980; Chris Bruno, 1991-1993

Iris Wheeler
Played by Beverlee McKinsey, 1972-1980; Carole Shelley, 1980; Carmen Duncan, 1988-1994

Dean Whitney
Played by Christopher Noth, 1988

Cass Winthrop
Played by Stephen Schnetzer, 1982-1986, 1987-1999

Charlie Winthrop
Played by Lindsay Fabes, 1994-1995; Kellyann Murphy, 1997

Morgan Winthrop
Played by Grayson McCouch, 1993-1996

Stacey Winthrop
Played by Terry Davis, 1982-1984; Hilary Edson, 1989-1991

Rain Wolfe
Played by Sarah Hyland, 1997-1998

Kathy Wolikowski
Played by Priscilla Garita, 1993

Lisa Woo
Played by Linda Wang, 1998-1999

Remy Woods
Played by Taylor Stanley, 1998-1999

Chris Wylie
Played by Tracy Brooks Swope, 1982

Y

Z
Cal Zimmerman
Played by Jason Ingram, 1977-1978

Who's Who in Another World references link
Who's Who in Bay City on Another World at  soapcentral.com

References

 

Another World